The 1973–74 I liga was the 48th season of the Polish Football Championship and the 40th season of the I liga, the top Polish professional league for association football clubs, since its establishment in 1927. The league was operated by the Polish Football Association (PZPN).

The champions were Ruch Chorzów, who won their 11th Polish title.

Competition modus
The season started on 25 August 1973 and concluded on 7 August 1974 (autumn-spring league). It was interrupted between the 27th matchday (12 May) and the 28th matchday (31 July) due to the 1974 FIFA World Cup. The season was played as a round-robin tournament. The team at the top of the standings won the league title. A total of 16 teams participated, 14 of which competed in the league during the 1972–73 season, while the remaining two were promoted from the 1972–73 II liga. Each team played a total of 30 matches, half at home and half away, two games against each other team. Teams received two points for a win and one point for a draw.

League table

Results

Top goalscorers

References

Bibliography

External links
 Poland – List of final tables at RSSSF 
 List of Polish football championships 
 History of the Polish League 
 List of Polish football championships 

Ekstraklasa seasons
1
Pol